Ernst Schwarz (19 June 1895 – 14 April 1983) was an Austro-Hungarian-born German philologist who was Professor of Ancient German language and Literature at Charles University, and later Professor of Germanic and German Philology at the University of Erlangen–Nuremberg. Schwarz specialized in Germanic studies, especially dialectology and onomastics, with a particular focus on the Sudeten Germans.

Biography
Moritz Schönfeld was born in Haida, Austria-Hungary on 19 June 1895. He was the son of glass exporter Franz Schwarz. After graduating from gymnasium in Böhmisch-Leipa in 1914, Schwarz studied German, history and geography at the University of Prague.  During World War I, Schwarz served in the Austro-Hungarian Army. After the war, he resumed his studies. Schwarz received his doctorate and passed the state examination for German, history and geography in 1920, after which he worked as a teacher in Chomutov.

Since 1921, Schwarz worked as a professor at a commercial academy in Jablonec nad Nisou. He completed his habilitation in German philology at Charles University in 1923. Since 1930, Schwarz served as Associate Professor, and from 1935, Professor of Ancient German Language and Literature at Charles University. From 1939 to 1941, Schwarz was Dean of the Philological Faculty at Charles University. During this time, Schwarz headed a number of research projects on the language and history of Sudeten Germans. He was a member of the Historische Kommission für Schlesien, and from 1939 to 1945 Co-Editor of the Zeitschrift für Sudetendeutsche Geschichte.

Schwarz was expelled from Czechoslovakia in 1948, and subsequently worked as a primary school teacher in Pirna, while lecturing at the Philosophisch-theologische Hochschule Regensburg. From 1955 to 1963, Schwarz was Professor of Germanic and German Philology at the University of Erlangen–Nuremberg. During this time, Schwarz founded what is known as the Erlanger School of dialectology and onomastics. He was a prominent member of the number of scholarly organizations and commissions, and a co-founder of the Collegium Carolinum. He received the Bavarian Order of Merit in 1964, and the Georg Dehio Cultural Prize in 1970.

Selected works
 Die Ortsnamen des östlichen Oberösterreich, 1920
 Unsere Mundart, 1927
 Die Ortsnamen der Sudetenländer als Geschichtsquelle, 1931
 Sudetendeutsche Sprachräume, 1935
 Sudetendeutsches Flurnamenbuch, 1935-1941
 Die volksgeschichtlichen Grundlagen der Iglauer Volksinsel, 1943
 Deutsche Namenforschung, 1949-1950
 Deutsche Mundartforschung, 1950-1951
 Deutsche und Germanische Philologie, 1951
 Goten, Nordgermanen, Angelsachsen, 1951
 Sudetendeutsches Wörterbuch
 Die Herkunft der Alemannen. Grundfragen der Alemannischen Geschichte, 1952
 Germanische Stammeskunde, 1956
 Sudetendeutsche Familiennamen aus vorhussitischer Zeit, 1957
 Die Herkunft der Siebenbürger und Zipser Sachsen, Ostmitteldeutsche, Rheinländer im Spiegel der Mundarten, 1957
 Sudetendeutscher Wortatlas, 1954-1958
 Atlas zur Geschichte der Deutschen Ostsiedlung, 1958
 Sprache und Siedlung in Nordostbayern, 1960
 Volkstumsgeschichte der Sudetenländer, 1961-1965
 Volkstumsgeschichte der Sudetenländer, 1965-1966
 Germanische Stammeskunde zwischen den Wissenschaften, 1967
 Kurze deutsche Wortgeschichte, 1982
 Der Ackermann aus Böhmen des Johannes von Tepl und seine Zeit, 1968
 Zur germanischen Stammeskunde : Aufsätze zum neuen Forschungsstand, 1972
 Sudetendeutsche Familiennamen des 15. und 16. Jahrhunderts, 1973
 Probleme der Namenforschung im deutschsprachigen Raum, 1977

See also
 Jan de Vries (philologist)
 Moritz Schönfeld

Sources

 Jahrbuch für fränkische Landesforschung 20/21 (1960/61)
 Bohemia Jahrbücher 6 (1965) and 16 (1975)
 Horst Haider Munske:  Nachruf auf Ernst Schwarz. Zeitschrift für Bayerische Landesgeschichte (ZBLG) 47 (1984) 907–910.

1895 births
1983 deaths
Charles University alumni
Academic staff of Charles University
German philologists
Germanic studies scholars
Germanists
Linguists of Germanic languages
Nazi Party members
People from Nový Bor
Sudeten German people
Academic staff of the University of Erlangen-Nuremberg
20th-century philologists